Chocolatier 2: Secret Ingredients is a casual strategy video game, developed by Big Splash Games LLC and published by PlayFirst. The game was released on 2008 for the Mac OS X and Windows. In Chocolatier 2: Secret Ingredients, players are able to create chocolate by combining ingredients, however you have to know the exact combination to get the secret recipe. It is the second video game in the Chocolatier series.

Gameplay and plot

The Chocolate Tasting Laboratory

After becoming an Entrepreneur, players can now buy the Chocolate Tasting Laboratory located in Buenos Aires. In the lab, players can create chocolate recipes using the ingredients slot, however, you need to know the exact combination of the secret recipe. After combining won't have access to the laboratory for a week because they are still cleaning test tubes, etc.

Purchases
Players can purchase ingredients all over the world, some of the market sells mostly sugars and cacao beans. Certain ingredients and beans are only available in certain places in the world, for example the Wild Island Berries can only be purchased at the Bouma Bure in Fiji, a secret port. Ingredients can also be rewarded to players if they finish certain quests.

3 Modes of Gameplay 
 Story Mode: The first mode unlocked in the game.
 Free Play Mode: Unlocked after finishing the tutorial.
 Web Play: Only available with the PlayFirst version of the game.
*Web Play isn't included with the BigFish, RealArcade/GameHouse, etc. versions of the game.

Minigames
There are three different minigames in Chocolatier 2: Secret Ingredients:
Making Chocolates: Players must shoot out ingredients into the correct tray. If all five tray is filled correctly, players will receive five case/week. If the players match the available tray colours, they'll receive production bonus. But if they missed eight ingredients, production will be halted. This minigame is available on any factory that's equipped with a chocolate machine (Squares, infusions, sauces, etc.)
Toss of the Dice: First the player will roll 2 dice, then the opponent will roll 2 dice too. Then the player will roll again 2 dice and your opponent will roll again 2 dice too. The one with the highest number in the dice will win. The player can add more to the bet after rolling the first 2 dice.
Mystery Box:First, players choose their wager. After choosing wagers they may open mystery boxes, these boxes are filled with money, but three of them are filled with a "Whammy" If players found a whammy, their bet and extra earnings from opening boxes is taken. They can choose to quit at any time (even if their earnings doesn't reach the original bet) This minigame is available by being asked by people when you travel or by going to New York's The Blind Pig.

References

External links
http://www.gamefaqs.com/pc/945001-chocolatier-2-secret-ingredients

2008 video games
Business simulation games
Games built with Playground SDK
Lua (programming language)-scripted video games
IOS games
MacOS games
Video games developed in the United States
Windows games
Cooking video games
PlayFirst games